Bad Feilnbach is a municipality in the Upper Bavarian district of Rosenheim at the foot of Wendelstein Mountain in Germany. As a famous 'Moorheilbad' (moor healing spa) the municipality was awarded in 1973 the title "Bad". Since the 19th century the peat deposits were the basis for a continued expansion of the spa and health facilities. The recognized healing success of "black gold" on a variety of diseases were the basis for the development of a well-known spa and tourist community. Due to its wooded surroundings and the mild climate Feilnbach is called the "Bavarian Meran". The entire municipality is recognized as a healing spa resort except for parts of the former municipality Dettendorf.

Geography
Bad Feilnbach is located directly on the northern edge of the Bavarian Alps, at the foot of the 1,838 m high Wendelstein. The village is located 17 km east of Miesbach, 10 km south of Bad Aibling, 15 km southwest of Rosenheim and 33 km from Kufstein. The Autobahn A8 (junction Bad Aibling) is 5 km away, German federal highway B93 (exit Reischenhart) 9 km, and the nearest railway stations in Bad Aibling and Raubling are 10 km.

Constituent communities 
The municipality Bad Feilnbach has 77 officially designated districts:

History
Feilnbach became an independent municipality in 1818, following administrative reform in Bavaria.

From 27 May 1897 until 1973 Feilnbach was at the end of the local railway Bad Aibling-Feilnbach.

On 1 January 1966, the municipalities Feilnbach and Wiechs were merged to form the new community Feilnbach-Wiechs whose name was changed on 28 December 1971 in Feilnbach. Following municipal reform, on 1 January 1972 Bad Aibling was incorporated into the municipality. Dettendorf followed on 1 February 1972. On October 22, 1973, the community received the additional title Bad (bath). Finally, the community Litzldorf was incorporated into Bad Feilnbach on May 1, 1978.

On July 1, 1972, Bad Feilnbach, which was previously part of the district of Bad Aibling, was made part of the Rosenheim district.

The individual settlements were probably formed in Roman times and Feilnbach is first mentioned in 980 as "Fulinpah", which is derived from the name for a sluggish or slow flowing brook (Bach). The municipality extends from the foothills of Wendelstein far into the moorland of Rosenheim Basin, covering approximately 5,800 ha.

Crest History
The silver wave bar is a symbol of Bach (brook) and represents the main town Feilnbach, whose name was derived from "Faulenbach" (Fulinpah). The Silver Church was originally taken from the coat of arms of the nobles of Diepertskirchen. These gentlemen held the seat in Lippertskirchen from the beginning of the 11th to the late 15th century. The coat of arms was adopted in 1957 by Feilnbach and amended in 1966. In 1973 the town was awarded the title "Bad" and since then bears the name of Bad Feilnbach. Thus the place underlines its importance as a mud spa and natural healing village. (See. House of Bavarian History)

Population development (at December 31)

Source: Municipality Bad Feilnbach

Business, tourism and infrastructure
Several large spa and rehabilitation facilities are located in Bad Feilnbach. The treatments in these facilities are based on "Badetorf" traditional spa therapy. 
As the town of Bad Feilnbach has been a recognised Spa since 1973, several alternative healing method 'bathing' doctors and medical practitioners have settled in Bad Feilnbach. (TCM, homeopathy, herbal medicine, Ayurveda, Naturopathy...).
The 4 star Bad Feilnbach Imperial Camping Outdoor Resort, with 800 parking spaces, is an integral part of the tourist offer of Bad Feilnbach since 1968.

Education and social services
 Primary and Secondary School Bad Feilnbach
 Elementary School Au
 four municipal nursery schools and two Catholic kindergartens
 Nursing home St. Martin
 Nursing, therapy and wellness center St. Luke
 Ecumenical Nachbarschaftshilfe Bad Feilnbach eV
 German religious rehabilitation center

Public institutions
 Municipality with spa and guest information
 Travel service the spa and guest information
 Volkshochschule Bad Feilnbach
 Swimming pool in Bad Feilnbach (heated)
 Swimming in Au
 Adventure playground "Burgaltendorf Waldeck" in Au
 Adventure playground "Alter Bahnhof" in Bad Feilnbach
 Religious and communal library

Spa and Health
 There are several spa and rehabilitation clinics and health clinics in the city:
 Clinic + more Reithofpark
 Clinic + more Blumenhof
 Outpatient therapy center Bad Feilnbach

Nature experiences and leisure experience facilities
 Jenbachtal and Jenbachwasserfälle
 Nature reserve Auer Weitenmoos
 Moorerlebnis station "Sterntaler felts"
 Theme "On Traces of God"
 Water experience "Jenbachparadies"
 Horses Region Upper Bavaria / Tyrol with remote bridleways
 Industrial monument "Old cement plant" in Litzldorf

Parks
Bad Feilnbach has several "nature" parks in the municipal area and along the Jenbachtal. In the upper part of the Jenbachtal, an adventure trail, the "Jenbachwasser", follows the waterfalls and cataracts from the upper car park and the mountain pastures in Jenbachtal to the outskirts of the town. Later the adventure trail leads to the nature park along the lower Jenbach. There is the theme "On Traces of God" and the water experience "Jenbachparadies" with the water playground. Next to the City Hall and "Haus des Gastes" is a small spa with pavilion for spa concerts and events as well as a natural pool. The theme trails "On Traces of God", the "Moorerlebnis Sterntaler felts" and the "Jenbachparadies" were all funded by the EU LEADER program.

Politics

Council 
Election of March 16, 2014 : 
Tenure from 1 May 2014 to 30 April 2020
 CSU : 10 seats
 SPD : 3 seats
 FW : 7 seats

Mayor 
The Mayor of Bad Feilnbach is Anton Wallner (CSU), elected in 2018.

Sports 
 SV Bad Feilnbach eV
 Tennis Club Bad Feilnbach eV
 SG Wendelstein eV (shooting club)
 Mini Golf Club Bad Feilnbach eV - 18 holes minigolf (concrete paths)
 ASV Au
 Au Ski Club eV
 EC Bad Feilnbach curling

Regular events 
 Weibamarkt (April and November)
 Wendelstein tour in Au (August)
 Rossererfest (third weekend in August)
 Baths run (September)
 Bavaria's largest apple market with Gewerbeschau three days (second Friday, Saturday and Sunday in October)
 Plum Festival (September 3 to Sunday, Aumanwirt, Altofing)
 Leonhardiritt in Lippert churches (first or second Sunday in November)
 Grama-Schupfenfest in Lengenfeld village, Koal Schupf, second weekend in June
 Moss Prost in Dette village, every year at Pentecost
 Night flea market and street fair of volunteer firefighters Bad Feilnbach (June)
 Chor des Bayerischen week Sängerbund
 Spa concerts and cultural evenings
 Sommerfest in the Natural Park (June)
 Christmas Market in the Natural Park (December)
 Christmas Cup / indoor tournament of the SV Bad Feilnbach

Sons and daughters of the town 
 Wolfgang Dientzenhofer (1648–1706), baroque architect
 Georg Dientzenhofer (1643–1689), baroque architect
 Abraham Millauer (around 1680-1758), architect, church builder
 Franz Xaver Gernstl (born 1951), filmmaker

Bad Feilnbacher churches

References

External links 

 
 Website der Gemeinde Bad Feilnbach
Bad Feilnbach: Amtliche Statistik des Bayerisches Landesamt für Statistik

Rosenheim (district)
Spa towns in Germany